Kęstutis Andziulis  (born January 20, 1948, in Jieznas) is a Lithuanian artist and art restorer.

Life
In 1973 he graduated from the Lithuanian Art Institute. 
Since 1973, he has contributed to the restoration of cultural monuments in Vilnius and since 1981, a Kaunas artist.
In 1978, he studied art restoration in Erfurt, and 1998 in Florence.

He has contributed to restoring many churches and secular buildings, the decoration of wall paintings including:
 1973–1974 Verkiai palace in Vilnius
 1974–1979 St. Ion church in Vilnius, with others
 1976–2000 Pažaislis church and monastery, frescoes
 2005–2008 John Mackeviciaus panel Kaunas Chamber, the Great Hall of Duke Vytautas

References

External links
Artist webpage

1948 births
Living people
People from Prienai District Municipality
Lithuanian painters
Vilnius Academy of Arts alumni